Strange Illusion is a 1945 film noir version of Hamlet, envisioned as a modern crime film. It was directed by Edgar G. Ulmer and starred Jimmy Lydon, Warren William and Sally Eilers. According to noir historian Spencer Selby the film is "a stylish cheapie by the recognized master of stylish cheapies."

Premise
A college student has a recurrent dream that leads him to suspect there is something sinister about his widowed mother's suitor.

Cast
 Jimmy Lydon as Paul Cartwright (as James Lydon)
 Warren William as Brett Curtis
 Sally Eilers as Virginia Cartwright
 Regis Toomey as Dr. Martin Vincent
 Charles Arnt as Prof. Muhlbach
 George Reed as Benjamin, the butler
 Jayne Hazard as Dorothy Cartwright
 Jimmy Clark as George Hanover
 Mary McLeod as Lydia
 Pierre Watkin as Dist. Atty. Wallace Armstrong
 Sonia Sorel as Charlotte Farber
 Victor Potel as Mac Game Warden (as Vic Potel) 
 George Sherwood as Langdon
 Gene Roth as Sparky (as Gene Stutenroth)
 John Hamilton as Bill Allen

Reception

Critical response
Film critic Dennis Schwartz gave the film a mixed review, yet liked the atmospherics of the film, and wrote, "The dark psychological thriller had an engrossing premise courtesy of Mr. Shakespeare and was influenced further by Freudian dream analysis, but it was unconvincing as a melodrama, the script was weak, the plot was full of holes and the acting was as lame as it gets...What's interesting is that the film is shot as an intense dream sequence in shadowy black-and-white hues and its sense of delirium powerfully filters through the story almost wiping away the unconvincing heavy-handed performances of the villains and the mummified acting by the leads. It's a film where Ulmer's unique style and his film noir moody interjections work better than the derivative mystery story."

Critic Matthew Sorrento of Film Threat also lauded the film: "Though saddled with the script’s fetish for Freud, Ulmer stylizes his thriller without sending it adrift. Like his other great films, Strange Illusion is a shaggy quickie that takes fine shape throughout."

See also
 List of films in the public domain in the United States

References

External links

 
 
 
 
 
 

1945 films
1945 crime films
American mystery films
American black-and-white films
Film noir
Producers Releasing Corporation films
Films directed by Edgar G. Ulmer
1945 mystery films
American crime films
1940s English-language films
1940s American films